The Albion Central School District is a public school district in New York State that serves approximately 2,600 children in the village of Albion; most of the towns of Albion, Barre, Carlton, and Gaines; small parts of the towns of Kendall, Murray, and Ridgeway in Orleans County; and portions of the town of Elba in Genesee County, with an operating budget of $36 million.

The district motto is "Achievement, Character, and Success", is an alternate expansion of the district acronym "ACS."

The superintendent of schools is Mickey Edwards.

Board of Education
The Board of Education (BOE) consists of 9 members who serve overlapping 5-year terms. Elections are held each May for board members and to vote on the School
District Budget.

Current board members (September 2022) are:
Wayne Wadhams - President
Linda Weller - Vice President
Margy Brown
John Kast
Christopher Kinter
Kurt Schmitt
David Sidari
Ocie Bennett, Jr.
Trellis Pore

Schools

Ronald L. Sodoma Elementary School (PreK-5)
Rachel Curtin (Principal)

Kevin Beaumont (Vice Principal)

Carl I. Bergerson Middle School (6-8)
Brad Pritchard (Principal)

Mariah LaSpina (Assistant Principal)

Charles C. D'Amico High School (9-12)
Jennifer Ashbery (Principal) (July 1, 2019)

Katharine Waite (Assistant Principal)

Rules
The Albion District has a strict code system called the "Code of Conduct". Many consequences can take place if these rules are broken. WEBB (We Expect Better Behavior), Detention (which can last until 4:15 P.M) in the middle school, trip to principals, suspension (or possibly be expelled), CR (Correction Room) for the high school. The elementary school does not have detention. WEBB is a common form of punishment in the elementary school after being sent to the office. In the middle school, WEBB is used on its own, currently being run by Mike Jones.

Time
Carl I. Bergerson Middle School  & Charles C. D'Amico High School: Starts at 7:45 ET (6:45 CT) and ends at 2:22 ET (1:22 CT)
Ronald L. Sodoma Elementary School: Starts at 9:00 ET (8:00 CT) and ends at 3:10 ET (2:10 CT)

Bells
The middle and high Schools have different bell schedules for changing classes. However, the elementary school does not have these bells.

Technology
Albion Central Schools have an advanced computer network. The three school buildings are interconnected on a district-wide fiber-optic network. They provide all middle and high school students with touchscreen HP Chromebooks.

References

External links
Albion Central School District Website

School districts in New York (state)
Albion, Orleans County, New York
Education in Orleans County, New York